Claude Chabauty (born May 4, 1910 in Oran,  died June 2, 1990 in Dieulefit) was a French mathematician.

Career 

He was admitted in 1929 to the École normale supérieure in Paris. In 1938 he obtained his doctorate with a thesis on number theory and algebraic geometry. Subsequently he was a professor in Strasbourg. From 1954 on, and for 22 years, he was the director of the department of pure mathematics at the University of Grenoble.

Mathematical work 

He worked on Diophantine approximation and geometry of numbers, where he used both classical and p-adic analytic methods. He introduced the Chabauty topology to generalise Mahler's compactness theorem from Euclidean lattices to more general discrete subgroups.

His 1938 doctoral thesis, developing ideas of Skolem, is important in algebraic geometry. According to André Weil:

Notes and References

20th-century French mathematicians
French people of colonial Algeria
1910 births
1990 deaths